Klassik Radio is a radio station in Germany. It specialises in classical music, Film music and Lounge music. The channel is receivable in over 300 German cities via FM, throughout Germany via cable, and in Europe via satellite. It is also worldwide streamed on the internet. At the start of the new national DAB standard DAB+ on 1 August 2011 Klassik Radio gained an additional technical range of 53.5 million households in the whole country. Klassik Radio is a subsidiary company of Klassik Radio Inc. located in Augsburg. The broadcasting centre is based in Hamburg.

The music Klassik Radio is broadcasting can be described as relaxation music which consists mainly of very light pieces of the repertoire of the classical music and, increasingly, film music that is suitable for conscious listening. Complete works of classical music are not played, but rather selected movements, which can be enjoyed individually.

1.7 million people listen to Klassik Radio everyday and 204.000 in an average hour (according to Media Analysis 2012 Radio I). These listeners are the premium target group in Germany because they have a high income, a high education above-average, a wide range of interests and they are very interested in culture.

History 
1990

Klassik Radio is first aired on 28 October.

1999

After long negotiations Ulrich R. J. Kubak (CEO of Klassik Radio) succeeds in taking over the majority of the shares in Klassik Radio from Burda, Spiegel, RTL, Universal, BMG and Christoph Gottschalk. Afterwards the program, the station and the marketing were completely relaunched.

2002

The number of listeners of Klassik Radio has more than doubled since the acquisition by Ulrich R. J. Kubak.
Relocation of the headquarters in Augsburg in the Media Tower.

2004

The Klassik Radio Inc. goes public on the Frankfurt Stock Exchange and is listed at the regulated market.

Frequencies

FM 
Baden-Württemberg
 90,4 Karlsruhe
 103,0 Göppingen
 103,9 Stuttgart

Bavaria
 91,1 Regensburg
 92,1 Würzburg
 92,2 Augsburg
 105,1 Nuremberg
 107,2 Munich

Berlin
 101,3 Berlin (Alexanderplatz)

Brandenburg
 87,6 Brandenburg an der Havel
 91,0 Frankfurt (Oder)
 101,3 Potsdam

Hamburg
 98,1 Hamburg (Heinrich-Hertz-Turm)

Hesse
 88,0 Gießen
 93,8 Bad Hersfeld
 96,0 Butzbach
 100,5 Wetzlar / Aßlar
 102,0 Limburg an der Lahn
 102,8 Fulda
 104,9 Marburg
 103,4 Bingen am Rhein
 104,1 Kassel
 107,5 Frankfurt am Main

Mecklenburg-Vorpommern
 90,1 Schwerin
 97,0 Wismar
 98,9 Stralsund

Lower Saxony
 107,4 Hanover

Schleswig-Holstein
 89,8 Heligoland
 89,8 Sylt / Westerland
 91,7 Garding
 92,7 Itzehoe
 92,9 Rendsburg
 93,6 Lübeck / Berkenthin
 93,9 Güby
 94,7 Niebüll
 97,2 Bungsberg / Eutin
 97,4 Kiel
 100,8 Schleswig
 106,5 Flensburg

Thuringia
 88,7 Weimar
 90,9 Eisenach
 99,3 Gotha
 104,5 Gera
 107,5 Altenburg

Tyrol (Austria)
 88,0 Wattens
 95,1 Inzing
 95,5 Innsbruck
Salzburg (Austria)

 99,8 Salzburg
 102,5 Salzburg

DAB+
Klassik Radio is transmitted in digital radio in all over Germany and Austria. In Germany it is a program of block DR Deutschland and can be found in channel 5C which is in frequency 178.352 MHz. In Austria Klassik Radio is part of the DAB+ Austria block and can be found in channels 5B, 5D, 6A, 6D and 8A (depending on the region).

DVB-S 
 Astra 19.2°E,  Transponder 103, Frequency 12.4605 GHz, Polarisation: horizontal, Symbol rate 27,500 MB/s, FEC 3/4

Notes

External links 
 
 Klassik Radio Channel

Radio stations in Germany
Radio stations established in 1990
Classical music radio stations
1990 establishments in Germany